Ekanayake Mudiyaselage Idame Gedara Indunil Madushan Herath (born 27 March 1993) is a Sri Lankan middle-distance runner who specialises in the 800 metres. He won a silver medal at the 2017 Asian Indoor and Martial Arts Games.

In 2018, Herath broke the national record in the men's 800 m (with a time of 1:47.13) at the Kenyan President's Cup athletics.

International competitions

Personal bests

Outdoor
400 metres – 48.30 (Colombo 2014)
800 metres – 1:47.13 (Kenya 2018)
Indoor
800 metres – 1:49.45 (Ashgabat 2017)

References

1993 births
Living people
Sri Lankan male middle-distance runners
Athletes (track and field) at the 2010 Summer Youth Olympics
Athletes (track and field) at the 2018 Asian Games
South Asian Games gold medalists for Sri Lanka
Asian Games competitors for Sri Lanka
South Asian Games medalists in athletics
20th-century Sri Lankan people
21st-century Sri Lankan people